Brother's Partnership (also called Peter Harmon House) is a historic house in Ellicott City, Howard County, Maryland.

The house is located on a 600-acre tract patented in 1734 by Joshua Dorsey named "Brother's Partnership". The house built on the property is a wooden structure with L shaped additions. James and Harriet Shipley sold the 66-acre property to Peter A. Harmon and the neighboring Curtis-Shipley Farmstead in 1874. In 1890 a kitchen addition was built onto the house. In 1927 a major restoration was completed. The property has been subdivided with no visible signs of the original farm. The house is surrounded by modern buildings in a residential cul-de-sac.

See also
List of Howard County properties in the Maryland Historical Trust
Curtis-Shipley Farmstead
Long Reach, Columbia, Maryland
Wheatfield (Ellicott City, Maryland)
Bethesda (Ellicott City, Maryland)

References

Howard County, Maryland landmarks
Houses in Howard County, Maryland